Puerto Rico Highway 31 (PR-31) is a main, rural highway connecting Juncos at Puerto Rico Highway 198 to Naguabo at Puerto Rico Highway 3.

Route description
PR-31 is an alternate route for people who are going from Caguas and other nearby towns to Naguabo, without having to pass through Humacao. It is located south of El Yunque and is constantly flooded, even with little rainfall. Several farms are close to this highway and it has two intersections with Puerto Rico Highway 53. Taking PR-30 and PR-53 to Naguabo can be faster depending on the traffic.

Major intersections

See also

 List of highways numbered 31

References

External links
 

031